Agathis robusta, commonly known as the Queensland kauri (pine) or smooth-barked kauri, is a coniferous tree in the family Araucariaceae. Although sometimes called a pine it is not a true pine, having leaves rather than needles. It has a disjunct distribution, occurring in Papua New Guinea and Queensland, Australia. Populations in Papua New Guinea may be treated as the distinct species Agathis spathulata.

Description
The trunk is usually around  diamater at breast height (DBH), but occasionally may reach . The bark is orange-brown to grey-brown, smooth, but shedding in large flakes. 

The globose, green seed cones measure  diameter with up to 440 scales, and mature in 18–20 months after pollination. They disintegrate at maturity to release the seeds.

Taxonomy
The Queensland kauri was first described as Dammara robusta in 1859 by the German born Australian botanist Ferdinand von Mueller and published in the journal Quarterly Journal and Transactions of the Pharmaceutical Society of Victoria. In 1883 the Colonial Botanist of Queensland Frederick Manson Bailey published a paper in which he gave the species its current binomial name Agathis robusta.

Subspecies
There are two recognised subspecies , namely Agathis robusta ssp. nesophila Whitmore, which is restricted to New Guinea and New Britain, and the autonymous subspecies Agathis robusta ssp. robusta.

Etymology
The genus name Agathis is from the Ancient Greek word ἀγαθίς, "ball of thread", a reference to the appearance of the female cones (seed cones). The species epithet is derived from the Latin word rōbustus meaning "robust".

Distribution and habitat 
Agathis robusta occurs in three distinct locations — a southern population in southeast Queensland in the regions around Gympie, Maryborough, and K'gari (Fraser Island); another population in northeast Queensland in the regions from Ingham to Cooktown, including the Atherton Tablelands; and the third in New Guinea. The north Queensland population was formerly recognised as Agathis palmerstonii, but is now considered to be synonymous with the southern grouping.

Ecology
The fruit of the Queensland kauri are eaten by sulphur-crested cockatoos (Cacatua galerita).

Conservation
Agathis robusta is listed by both the Queensland Department of Environment and Science and the IUCN as least concern. However, the IUCN assessment states that the "subspecies in Papua New Guinea has been assessed as Vulnerable" due to ongoing, albeit limited, logging.

Pests and diseases
A number of Lepidoptera species utilise the Queensland kauri as a host plant, including Agathiphaga queenslandensis, Heteropsyche poecilochroma, Leipoxais rufobrunnea, Darna nararia, Orgyia australis, Achaea janata, and Lexias dirtea.

Uses
This tree produces a high quality timber which was used for a variety of purposes such as cabinetmaking, joinery, framing, and plywood. This led to it being heavily logged from the mid 19th century, with the result that the large stands of these trees which were once common are now gone, although many individual trees may still be found. Logging in north Queensland continued until the establishment of the Wet Tropics of Queensland World Heritage area in 1987.

Gallery

References

External links
 
 
 View a map of historical sightings of this species at the Australasian Virtual Herbarium
 View observations of this species on iNaturalist
 View images of this species on Flickriver
 Agathis robusta at the Gymnosperm Database.

robusta
Flora of Queensland
Trees of Australia
Pinales of Australia
Least concern flora of Australia
Least concern biota of Queensland
Taxa named by Frederick Manson Bailey
Plants described in 1883